Qualification for powerlifting at the 2020 Summer Paralympics began on 25 May 2018 and finished on 27 June 2021. There were 180 powerlifters (80 male, 80 female and 20 gender free) competing in 20 events (10 male, 10 female).

Timeline

Quotas
A qualification slot is allocated to the individual athlete not to the NPC:
An NPC can allocated no more than eight male and female slots with a maximum of one powerlifter per medal event. Exceptions may be granted through the Bipartite Invitation Commission Allocation method.
An athlete can only be eligible to compete if they complete the requirements set out in the World Para Powerlifting Qualification Pathway 2017-2020 or have achieved an MQS (Minimum Qualification Standard).

Minimum Qualification Standard targets

Summary

Qualified slots
Top ranked eight male and female powerlifters are automatically qualified to compete for their respective bodyweight category, as of 27 June 2021.

Men

Women

See also
Weightlifting at the 2020 Summer Olympics – Qualification

References

Powerlifting at the 2020 Summer Paralympics